The 2008 European Under-21 Baseball Championship was an international baseball competition held in Pamplona, Spain from September 3 to 7, 2008. It featured teams from Belgium, Czech Republic France, Germany, Italy, Russia, Spain and Slovakia.

In the end host Spain won the tournament.

Group stage

Pool A

Standings

Game results

Pool B

Standings

Game results

Final round

Semi-finals

3rd place

Final

Final standings

External links
Game Results

References

2008 in baseball
European Under-21 Baseball Championship
2008
2008 in Spanish sport